This article lists characters of Star Trek in their various canonical incarnations. This includes fictional major characters and fictional minor characters created for Star Trek, fictional characters not originally created for Star Trek, and real-life persons appearing in a fictional manner, such as holodeck re-creations.

Characters from all series, listed alphabetically

Key

A

B

C

D

E

F

See also 
 List of Star Trek characters G–M N–S T–Z
 List of recurring Star Trek: Deep Space Nine characters Enterprise The Next Generation The Original Series Voyager
 List of Star Trek episodes

References 

A-F

de:Personen im Star-Trek-Universum
id:Daftar tokoh Star Trek